Allen Chi Zhou Fan (born 2004) is a New Zealand chess player. He was awarded the title of FIDE Master (FM) in 2019.

Chess career 
He finished second in the New Zealand Open Junior Championship in 2017, scoring 4½/6.

He qualified to play in the Chess World Cup 2021, where he was drawn to play Constantin Lupulescu in the first round, but he was unable to make it to the event and was defeated in a walkover.

References

External links
 
 

2004 births
Living people
New Zealand chess players
Chess FIDE Masters